Tory (Toor) is a rural locality (a selo) in Tunkinsky District, Republic of Buryatia, Russia. The population was 876 as of 2010. There are 18 streets.

Geography 
Tory is located 67 km east of Kyren (the district's administrative centre) by road. Dalakhay is the nearest rural locality.

References 

Rural localities in Tunkinsky District